was a district in Japan belonging to Mutsu Province (currently to Miyagi Prefecture). Established in the 8th century as Korehari or Koreharu District (伊治郡) and abolished in 2005, the territory is identical to the city of Kurihara today.

Kurihara was established as Korehari in the 8th century as a frontier district of the Mutsu Province. At that time, Korehari was the northern limit of the Japanese dominance at the pacific side of the region. Ancient Japan had continued conquest wars against Emishi. One time in 780 the district head and an Emishi officer in Japanese army, Korehari no Azamaro, revolted at the Korehari Castle and killed the governor of the Tohoku area. Much later Korehari had its name changed to Kurihara.

The district occupied the northwest part of the Sendai Plain. The population had enjoyed fertile land for rice cultivation. In addition, Kurihara has a relatively peaceful history with few if any warloads hailing from the district. The Date clan had ruled it from Sendai during the Edo period. Kurihara was incorporated into Miyagi Prefecture after the Meiji restoration.

Towns and villages

 Hanayama
 Ichihasama
 Kannari
 Kurikoma
 Semine
 Shiwahime
 Takashimizu
 Tsukidate
 Uguisuzawa
 Wakayanagi

Former districts of Miyagi Prefecture